Pelion or Pelium may refer to:
Pelion, a mountain range in Thessaly, Greece
49036 Pelion, an asteroid named after the mountain
Pelion (Illyria), a fortified settlement in the borderlands of Illyria and Macedonia
Pelion (Thessaly), a city in ancient Thessaly, Greece
Pelion, South Carolina, United States
Pelion Mountain, mountain in Canada
Pelion Range, mountain in Tasmania, Australia
SS Pilion, a ship